Reuben Walter Fischer (September 19, 1916 – July 16, 1997) was an American professional baseball player and right-handed pitcher who appeared in 108 games in Major League Baseball for the New York Giants (1941; 1943–1946).

Fischer began his minor-league career in 1937, spending a year in the Detroit Tigers' organization before being acquired by the Giants. Four years later, in September 1941, he made his MLB debut. He appeared in two games, a scoreless relief effort against the Cincinnati Reds on September 12, then a start against the Boston Braves eight days later—which resulted in a complete game, 7–3 victory.

The United States' entry into World War II in December 1941 began a depletion of MLB playing talent as athletes were called into the military. But Fischer did not return to the majors until June 1943, spending 1 years in the high minors. He was a member of the Giants' pitching staff from mid-June 1943 to mid-July 1946, as both a starter and reliever. His statistics were poor: counting his 1941 trial, he won only 16 of 50 decisions with a subpar 5.10 earned run average. In his 108 appearances and 382 career innings pitched, Fischer permitted 416 hits, 222 bases on balls, and 217 earned runs. He was credited with 136 strikeouts and four saves. In 41 games started, he threw seven complete games and one shutout, a five-hit, 8–0 blanking of Cincinnati on July 30, 1944, in which he helped his cause with three runs batted in.

Fischer returned to the minors in mid-1946, played through 1949, then—after a seven-year hiatus—made a brief comeback at age 40 in the Class A Western League in 1957, appearing in four games. He died in  Ashwaubenon, a village of Green Bay, Wisconsin, in 1997 at age 80.

References

External links

1916 births
1997 deaths
Baseball players from South Dakota
Clinton Giants players
Dallas Eagles players
Jersey City Giants players
Major League Baseball pitchers
Minneapolis Millers (baseball) players
New York Giants (NL) players
Oakland Oaks (baseball) players
People from Gregory County, South Dakota
Sioux City Cowboys players
Sioux City Soos players
Tulsa Oilers (baseball) players